King of the Hill is a 1993 American drama film written and directed by Steven Soderbergh. It is the second he directed from his own screenplay following his 1989 Palme d'Or-winning film Sex, Lies, and Videotape. It too was nominated for the Palme d'Or, at the 1993 Cannes Film Festival.

Plot
Based on the Depression-era bildungsroman memoir of writer A. E. Hotchner, the film follows the story of a boy struggling to survive on his own in a hotel in St. Louis after his mother enters a sanatorium with tuberculosis and his younger brother is sent to live with an uncle. His father, a German immigrant and traveling salesman working for the Hamilton Watch Company, is off on long trips from which the boy cannot be certain he will return.

Cast

 Jesse Bradford as Aaron
 Jeroen Krabbé as Mr. Kurlander
 Lisa Eichhorn as Mrs. Kurlander
 Karen Allen as Miss Mathey
 Spalding Gray as Mr. Mungo
 Elizabeth McGovern as Lydia
 Cameron Boyd as Sullivan
 Adrien Brody as Lester
 John McConnell as Patrolman Burns
 Amber Benson as Ella McShane
 Kristin Griffith as Mrs. McShane
 Katherine Heigl as Christina Sebastian
 Lauryn Hill as Elevator Operator

Reception
In her review in The New York Times, Janet Maslin says, "The film does a lovely job of juxtaposing the sharp contrasts in Aaron's life, and in marveling at the fact that he survives as buoyantly as he does."

The review aggregation website Rotten Tomatoes gives the film a 91% rating, based on reviews from 33 critics with an average score of 7.8/10, the site's critical consensus reads: " A subtle, affecting, character-driven coming-of-age story, King Of The Hill is one of Steven Soderbergh's best and most criminally overlooked films."

References

External links
 
 
 
 
King of the Hill: Alone Again an essay by Peter Tonguette at the Criterion Collection

1993 films
1990s coming-of-age drama films
American coming-of-age drama films
Films directed by Steven Soderbergh
Films set in St. Louis
Great Depression films
Films scored by Cliff Martinez
Films with screenplays by Steven Soderbergh
Films shot in St. Louis
1993 drama films
1990s English-language films
1990s American films